The Dnieper Upland or Cisdnieper Upland is a southeastern European plain occupying the territory between the Dnieper and the Southern Bug. It lies in central Ukraine, occupying the oblasts of Zhytomyr, Kyiv, Vinnytsia, Cherkasy, Kirovohrad and Dnipropetrovsk.

To its north lies Polesian Lowland, to the south lies Black Sea Lowland, eastern border is served by Dnieper. To the west of Dnieper Upland lies uplands of Podillia and Volhynia (see Volhynian-Podolian Upland). Its maximum is at  located in the northwestern portion. Among prominent features of the upland are Kyiv Mountains, Hills of Kaniv, others.

The regions is characterized by alteration of flooding watersheds with deep (up to ) sometimes canyon-like valleys of rivers and gulches. Especially dense ravine-gulch network is in the Cis-Dnieper portion of the upland, particularly within the hills of Kaniv.

The upland contains a number of minerals including iron, manganese,  granite, graphite, brown coal, kaolin etc.

References

External links
 Dnieper Upland at the Encyclopædia Britannica
 Dnieper Upland at the Great Soviet Encyclopedia
 Dnieper Upland at the Ukrainian Soviet Encyclopedia
 Zastavny, F.D. Physical geography of Ukraine.

 
East European Plain
Plains of Ukraine
Dnieper basin